Broadcasting tower can refer to

 Broadcasting Tower, Leeds - A skyscraper in Leeds, UK
 Radio masts and towers - The generic communications structure